Fieru River may refer to:

 Fieru River (Cojoci)
 Fieru River (Iacobeni)

See also 
 Fierarul River (disambiguation)
 Fieraru (surname)
 Fierăria River